Xi Zhong (Chinese: ) was a legendary Xia dynasty minister claimed to have served Yu the Great
credited in traditional Chinese sources with the invention of the chariot during the 2nd millennium BC. Modern archaeological evidence has not found support for that, however, and suggests instead a date closer to 1200 BC for the introduction of small-scale use of chariots.

See also
 Chinese chariot
 Cangjie

References

Xia dynasty
Chinese inventors